Hillsdale is an unincorporated community in Miami County, Kansas, United States. As of the 2020 census, the population of the community and nearby areas was 247. It is part of the Kansas City metropolitan area.

History
Hillsdale, originally called Columbia, was laid out in 1869 when the railroad was extended to that point.

The first post office in Columbia, established in August 1868, was renamed Hillsdale in April 1870, and still has a post office with ZIP code 66036.

Demographics

For statistical purposes, the United States Census Bureau has defined Hillsdale as a census-designated place (CDP).

Education
The community is served by Paola USD 368 public school district.

See also
 Hillsdale Lake and Hillsdale State Park

References

Further reading

External links
 Miami County maps: Current, Historic, KDOT

Census-designated places in Miami County, Kansas
Census-designated places in Kansas